is a fictional monster, or kaiju, resembling Godzilla, that first appeared in episode 10 of Tsuburaya Productions' 1966 series Ultraman, where it fought the titular hero and was killed in a duel with him. It has made a few limited appearances since its debut.

Overview

Name 
Jirahs' name likely comes from Godzilla's Japanese name . Jirahs is also known by the English names Jirass and Giras.

Development 
During the production of the first Ultraman series Eiji Tsuburaya considered Ultraman to face off against Godzilla for episode 10 however due to the shows minimal budget Tsuburaya and his company decided to create an entirely new monster instead. Jirahs' head was the reused Godzilla head from Invasion of Astro-Monster, and Jirahs' body was a diversion of the Godzilla suit used in Mothra vs. Godzilla, with Toho's approval. The dorsal fins and parts of the suit were sprayed yellow and a large yellow frill was added to disguise the connection of the head with the body.

Appearances

Film 

 Revive! Ultraman (1996, stock footage cameo)

Television 

 Ultraman (1966)
 Return of Ultraman (1971)
 Redman (1972)
Ultraman Tiga (1997)
Ultraman Boy's Ultra Coliseum (2003)
 Ultraman Z (2020)
 Sevenger Fight (2021)

Stage shows 

Ultraman Festival 97 (1997)

Video Games 
Ultra Kaiju Monster Rancher - Teaser with Crossovers Monster Rancher.

References 

Bibliography
 
 

Ultra Series characters
Fictional characters with superhuman strength
Fictional giants
Kaiju
Fictional monsters
Television characters introduced in 1966
Fictional reptiles
Fictional dinosaurs